The Buick Roadmaster is an automobile that was built by Buick from 1936 until 1942, from 1946 until 1958, and then again from 1991 until 1996. Roadmasters produced between 1936 and 1958 were built on Buick's longest non-limousine wheelbase and shared their basic structure with the entry-level Cadillac Series 65, the Buick Limited, and after 1940, the Oldsmobile 98. Between 1946 and 1957 the Roadmaster served as Buick's flagship.

When it was resurrected for the 1991 through 1996 model years, it became the marque's largest vehicle. The Roadmaster sedan, a C-body vehicle over its eight previous generations, shared the B-body for the first time in its history. It was  longer with a  greater wheelbase than the C-body Buick Park Avenue. It was also larger both in wheelbase and overall length than the K-body Cadillac DeVille.

A Buick Roadmaster Estate station wagon first appeared in 1947, and was manufactured in several generations through 1996.

1931-1933

The 1932 Series 80 was the first Buick with the  OHV Buick Straight-8 engine developing  at 2800 rpm. It was positioned as an upper category trim package and shared with the Series 90. The Series 80 was a new approach for Buick by marketing a luxury sedan with an eight-cylinder engine - that became expected from luxury brands - comparably as the Oldsmobile L-Series on the GM C platform. The 1932 models introduced a new high-performance engine developing . In 1933, the styling of all Buicks was updated with a new, corporate "streamlined" appearance shared with all GM cars for that year as influenced to GM's Art and Color Studio headed by Harley Earl.

The 1933 models were the first year all GM vehicles were installed with optional vent windows that were initially called "No Draft Individually Controlled Ventilation" that were later renamed "Ventiplanes" for which a patent application was filed on November 28, 1932. The patent was assigned to the Ternstedt Manufacturing Company, a GM subsidiary making components for Fisher Body 

At the end of 1933, the 80 series was discontinued after 24,117 units were produced. In 1936, the model changed its name to "Series 80 Roadmaster". 

Body style choices were limited to a 2-door coupe or 4-door sedan in 1931 capable of seating either 5- or 7-passengers, then replacing the coupe with a Victoria 5-passenger coupe in 1932. The 1933 model year saw convertibles for both the coupe and 4-door sedan convertible reviving the "phaeton" nameplate again, and additional manufacturing locations opened across the country under the Buick-Oldsmobile-Pontiac Assembly Division. The equipment levels and refinement of materials used were on par with the top-level Limited and was a contender with the Packard Eight.

1936–1937

The origins of the Roadmaster name date to 1936 when Buick added names to its entire model lineup to celebrate the engineering improvements and design advancements over their 1935 models. Buick's Series 40 was named the Special, the Series 50 became the Super, the Series 60 was named the Century and the Series 90 — Buick's largest and most luxurious vehicle — was named the Limited. The Series 50 was retired, but new for the model year was the Series 80 Roadmaster. The 1936 Buick sales brochure describes "It literally named itself the first time a test model leveled out on the open highway." The terminology "Series 60" and "Series 70" were shared with Cadillac, while "Series 60", "Series 70", "Series 80", and "Series 90" were shared with Oldsmobile.

The Roadmaster was introduced in a year when Buick's overhead valve straight-eight engines were heavily revised. Buick reduced the number of engines from four sizes to two: a 233-cubic-inch, 93-horsepower version for the Special, and a 320.2-cubic inch, 120-horsepower engine for the other series. Buick also adopted an all-steel "turret top" and hydraulic brakes. Coil springs were used in the front.

The Roadmaster sedan weighed 4,098 pounds, about 88 pounds more than Cadillac's new Series 60. The sedan sold for $1,255 ($ in  dollars ), $440 ($ in  dollars ) less than the least expensive Cadillac. The only other body style was a four-door convertible phaeton, priced at $1,565 ($ in  dollars ) (a total of 1,064 were produced), at a time when a Cadillac in the same body style sold was priced from $2,745 ($ in  dollars ). Buick sales went from just over 48,000 to nearly 158,000, with the new Series 80 Roadmaster contributing 16,049 units to that total.

Buick was the only GM car, along with the Chevrolet Standard, to retain the basic 1934 styling for 1935, thus the 1936 re-style brought Buick up with the rest of the GM marques. For 1937, Buick moved to newly re-styled bodies along with all other GM cars. The Roadmaster gained a divided grille with horizontal bars. The center section of the grille was painted to match the body of the car. Fenders became squared off and the headlight shells were streamlined. Overall height was reduced by  while keeping the same interior space. A new carburetor and revised camshaft raised engine horsepower to 130. The engine also received a new intake manifold, oil pump, cooling system, and a quieter overhead valve mechanism. A Formal Sedan, featuring a roll-down glass partition between the front and rear compartments, was added to the Roadmaster line for US$1,641 ($ in  dollars ), of which 452 were sold. The price of the sedan was raised to US$1,518, and that of the phaeton to US$1,856 ($ in  dollars ). Overall Roadmaster sales increased to 16,129.

1938–1939

Styling changes for 1938 were modest, with a longer hood extending to a now nearly vertical grill, taller bumper guards, and redesigned hubcaps. Changes were made to both engine and chassis. The ride was improved by replacing the rear leaf springs with coil springs and incorporating double-acting shock absorbers that were four times the size of others. The frame X-member was changed from I-beam to channel construction and all wood structural elements were replaced with steel. The engine combustion chambers were redesigned and new "turbulator" pistons raised the compression ratio from 5.9 to 6.5:1, resulting in an increase in horsepower to 141.

The 4-door convertible phaeton changed from the built-in trunk design to a "fastback" rear appearance. The Limited continued to be offered, and a new fastback sedan was added to the line with 466 being sold. The Roadmaster sedan price was increased to US$1,645 ($ in  dollars ). The overall automobile market decreased for the year, but Buicks share increased even with Roadmaster sales falling to 5,568 and now making up 3.3% of Buick's total output from its previous 7.3%.

Styling for 1939 featured a new two-piece “waterfall” grille with thin vertical bars. The hood was narrower, front door pillars were narrower and hubcaps were larger. The window area increased substantially with the rear window changing to a one-piece design. All the major gauges were relocated directly in front of the driver and the gear shift was changed to a steering column mount. The 4-door phaeton could now be ordered with the built-in trunk appearance or as a fastback, but only three of the latter were sold. Although prices were reduced to US$1,545 ($ in  dollars ), sales only rose to 6,097, with Roadmaster's share of Buick's total sales falling to 2.9%.

1940–1941

In 1940 the Series 80 was renamed Buick Limited. The Roadmaster name was transferred to the new Series 70, which was introduced at the same time as a brand new Series 50 Super. The Roadmaster featured a cutting-edge "torpedo" C-body. The new C-body that the 1940 Buick Roadmaster shared with the Super, the Cadillac Series 62, the Oldsmobile Series 90, and the Pontiac Torpedo featured shoulder and hip room that was over  wider, the elimination of running boards and exterior styling that was streamlined and 2-3" lower. When combined with a column-mounted shift lever the cars offered room for six-passengers.

The 1940 Roadmaster had a shorter wheelbase, was lighter, and was less expensive than the previous year's model. The formal and fastback sedans were discontinued. A 2-door coupe body style was newly introduced, and 3,991 units were sold. The coach-building firm of Brunn designed several custom-bodied Buicks for the Series 70, 80, and 90. Only one Roadmaster example is known to have been produced in 1940, an open-front town car, that was dubbed "Townmaster". Overall sales more than tripled to 18,345.

Styling updates for 1941 were modest, but there were mechanical changes. The compression ratio was raised from 6.6:1 to 7.0:1, the "turbulator" pistons were redesigned, smaller spark plugs were new, and "Compound Carburetion" was introduced. This Compound Carburetion was the forerunner of the modern four-barrel carburetor and consisted of twin two-barrel carburetors. One unit operated all of the time, while the other operated only under hard acceleration. The new engine delivered 165 horsepower. With five more horsepower than a senior Packard, 15 more than any Cadillac, and 25 more than the largest Chryslers, it was the most powerful engine available that year on an American car.

A new body style for this year was a two-door convertible, which sold 1,845 units. There was also a Brunn-designed convertible, but no orders materialized because of the $3,500 price ($ in  dollars ). Overall Roadmaster sales were 15,372.

1942, 1946-1948

The 1942 Roadmaster was longer, lower, wider, and roomier than before (a Harley Earl trademark), due in part to a longer wheelbase. There was also a new vertical-bar grille and "Airfoil" fenders that swept back to the rear fenders, which in subsequent generations became the chromed "Sweepspear". Both features became a Buick icon exhibited in one way or another for years to come, and were influenced by the concept car called the Buick Y-Job. The 4-door phaeton was discontinued. Coupes adopted the Sedanet fastback style that was introduced on 1941 on the Century and Special. The new one-piece hood was double-hinged so that either side of the engine compartment could be opened, while in later updates the hood would open at the front and extend up and towards the passenger compartment.

At the beginning of 1942, new automobiles were available only to those in occupations deemed essential to the war effort. By mid-January, cars with no exterior chrome trim apart from the bumpers were being produced. By February passenger car production was shut down completely. Despite the abbreviated model year, a total of about 8,400 were sold.

When postwar automobile production resumed in the 1946 model year, chrome was more sparingly applied, swept-back fenders were fitted to sedans as well as coupes, and a war-inspired "bombsight" hood ornament was adopted. The instrument panel was two-toned with woodgrain facings except on convertibles which used body-colored panels. Series identification was found on cloisonne emblems centered in the bumper guard front and rear. Compound Carburetion was discontinued and the compression ratio was reduced to 6.60:1. The 1946 Roadmaster's horsepower rating went from 165 to 144. Torque on the other hand was not affected. Nevertheless, Roadmaster's I-8 still produced more horsepower than a top-of-the-line Chrysler's. Owing to wartime inflation, prices were substantially higher than those of pre-war models. The biggest change was in sales proportions. Roadmaster increased its share of Buick sales from 4% in 1941 to 20% in 1946, with a total of about 31,400 sold.

In 1947 a new stamped grille with a separate upper bar was used. The Roadmaster name appeared in red-filled script on a chrome button within the bumper guard crossbars, front, and rear. All new was an Estate wagon body style. It sold 300 units and became the top of the line in the station wagon market.

In 1948 a series script appeared on the front fenders and the white Tenite steering wheel that had been used previously was replaced with a black version. This also matched the change from a two-tone woodgrain instrument panel to a two-tone gray instrument panel, with silver-finished instruments. A new optional custom trim option was offered, consisting of cloth upholstery with leather bolsters with the robe cord cover and lower door panels trimmed in leatherette. Convertibles acquired power windows, seat, and top as standard equipment. The Dynaflow was introduced, the first passenger car torque converter transmission. Optional on Roadmaster in its first year, it became standard equipment for 1949. Overall sales were just under 80,000 in both 1947 and 1948, over four times greater than in any prewar year.

1949–1953

The Roadmaster received its first major postwar restyling in 1949. Its wheelbase and overall length were reduced but its weight was marginally increased. The biggest change was a much larger two-piece, curved glass windshield that the sales brochure described as like an “observation car.” It was also in 1949 that Buick introduced "VentiPorts." Four were displayed on each of the Roadmaster and Century's front fenders, with three on the fenders of the Super and Special to denote junior level products. The sales brochure noted that VentiPorts helped ventilate the engine compartment, and possibly that was true in early 1949, but sometime during the model year they became plugged. 

The idea for VentiPorts grew out of a modification Buick styling chief Ned Nickles had added to his own 1948 Roadmaster. He had installed four amber lights on each side of his car's hood wired to the distributor to flash on and off as each piston fired simulating the flames from the exhaust stack of a fighter airplane. Combined with the bombsight mascot, VentiPorts put the driver at the controls of an imaginary fighter airplane. Upon seeing this, Buick chief Harlow Curtice was so delighted that he ordered that (non-lighting) VentiPorts be installed on all 1949 Buicks, with the number of VentiPorts (three or four) corresponding to the relative displacement of the straight-eight engine installed.

Dynaflow was now standard equipment, and engine horsepower was increased to 150 through a slight increase in the compression ratio. In the middle of the year, the Riviera joined the body style lineup selling 4,314 units. Featuring power windows as standard equipment, the 2-door Buick Roadmaster Riviera, along with the Cadillac Series 62 Coupe de Ville and the Oldsmobile 98 Holiday, was among the first hardtop coupes produced. The Riviera Hardtop was conceived by taking the convertible and welding a steel roof in place, which simplified manufacture and the appearance.

The Riviera was also notable for its popular optional "Sweepspear" chrome body side molding, which would soon become a Buick trademark. This chrome-plated strip started above the front wheel, after which it gently curved down nearly to the rocker panel just before the rear wheel, and then curved around the rear wheel in a quarter of a circle to go straight back to the tail-light. The "Riviera trim", as it was initially called, was also made available on the Roadmaster convertible late in the model year. With a total of 88,130 sold, the all-time annual record for Roadmaster, the model accounted for 27% of all Buick sales, a high proportion despite its price that was only slightly less than a Cadillac Series 61.

The 1950 restyling featured a "toothy" grille. The Sweepspear design was made standard on most body styles at the beginning of the 1950 model year, and on the station wagon and a new long-wheelbase sedan mid-year. The long-wheelbase sedan was lengthened by ). Like the convertibles, the Riviera and the long-wheelbase sedan came with power windows and power seats as standard equipment. Overall Roadmaster sales fell to 75,034, with Roadmaster's share of total Buick output plummeting to 12%.

In 1951 the long-wheelbase sedan was also called a Riviera although it was not a hardtop. The Sedanet and regular wheelbase sedan were discontinued.

Styling changes were minimal in 1951 and 1952. Power steering was added as an option in 1952 and horsepower climbed to 170 primarily to a new four-barrel carburetor. Sales continued to decrease to about 66,000 in 1951 and totaled 51,000 units in 1952.

A new V8 engine was introduced for 1953, Buick's Golden Anniversary year.

Buick also introduced a new "Twin-Turbine" Dynaflow as a companion for the V8 engine. Estimated to increase torque at the wheels by 10 percent, the new transmission provided faster and quieter acceleration at reduced engine speeds. Both power steering and power brakes were made standard. Air conditioning was a new option and, years before many other makes, a 12-volt electrical system was adopted.

A new body style for 1953 was the Skylark convertible. The Buick Roadmaster Skylark was one of three specialty convertibles produced in 1953 by General Motors, the other two being the Oldsmobile 98 Fiesta and the Cadillac Series 62 Eldorado. The Skylark featured open wheel wells, a drastically lowered beltline, a four-inch-chop from the standard Roadmaster's windshield, the absence of VentiPorts, and a new Sweepspear that anticipated Buick's 1954 styling. Kelsey-Hayes wire wheels and a solid boot cover were standard. At US$5,000 ($ in  dollars ) only 1,690 units were produced. The following year, and for one year only, it would become its own series built on the all-new  Century chassis. This was the last year for the Roadmaster Estate, and it was the last wood-bodied station wagon mass-produced in the United States. Its body was a product of Ionia Manufacturing that built all Buick station wagon bodies between 1946 and 1964. Priced at US$4,031 ($ in  dollars ), the Estate was second in price only to the Skylark, with 670 being sold. Overall Roadmaster sales went up to 79,137.

1954–1956

In 1954 Buick Roadmaster and Super shared with Cadillac and Oldsmobile 98 the new General Motors C-body, adopting the new "ponton" appearance, and the addition of "Dagmar bumpers" to the front. These were large, roomy cars, as much as five and a half inches longer in wheelbase and more than nine inches (229 mm) longer overall than in 1953. Roadmaster script was placed on the rear quarter panels and within the rear deck ornament. Rear fenders had a blunted fin at the rear edge, with dual "bullet" taillamps below. A new panoramic windshield with vertical side pillars was used. Seats had chrome bands on 2-door models and rear seats had an armrest on 4-door models. The front suspension was refined and Roadmaster's horsepower was increased to 200, while the pillared coupe and the Estate wagon were no longer offered as body styles. Overall sales dropped to 50,571 (which was 11% of model year production). and the Roadmaster Convertible was listed at US$3,521 ($ in  dollars ). Air conditioning was provided by Frigidaire optionally on sedans and hardtops, which consisted of a self-contained unit that was retrofitted at the customers' request.

In 1955 broad lower rear fender bands, gold-colored Roadmaster deck script and hood ornament, bars on the hubcaps, and a gold-accented grille were added to distinguish Roadmaster. Horsepower was increased to 236, and a new variable-pitch Dynaflow, in which the stator blades changed pitch under hard acceleration, provided quicker off-the-line getaway. Back-up lights were now standard. Overall sales were 64,527 (which was 8% of the model year production). and the Roadmaster Convertible replaced the exclusive Roadmaster Skylark convertible.

In 1956 Roadmaster had a shallower Sweepspear that did not dip down to the rocker panel as on other models. Twin chrome strips were on the decklid with Roadmaster spelled out between them. Roadmaster script was positioned on the doors beneath the vent windows. Fender tip dual bombsights were standard. Two stator wheels were adopted as an improvement to Dynaflow. A brand new 4-door Riviera hardtop, proved to be the most popular Roadmaster, with 24,770 units sold and beating the pillared sedan by more than two-to-one. Overall sales were 53,427 (which was 9% of model year production). A padded dash became standard.

1957–1958

A lower body graced the 1957 Roadmaster with an even more panoramic windshield equipped with reverse slanted pillars. A red-filled Sweepspear lined the bodysides and a chromed rear fender lower panel filled the area between the wheelhouse and the bumper end, continuing to offer "Dagmar bumpers" at the front. A new centered fuel filler was located in the rear bumper, the ends of which the single or optional dual exhaust passed through. Roadmaster script was placed within the deck and grille emblems. Two-door models had a trio of chevrons on the rear quarters while the four-door models had a Roadmaster emblem nestled within the Sweepspear dip. Interiors featured a padded dashboard and were broadcloth and nylon in 4-doors, nylon in 2-doors, and leather in convertibles. Front hip room was 65.3-in.

A new 364-cubic-inch engine was rated at 300 horsepower. A new ball-joint suspension system improved handling. The 4-door Riviera hardtop proved popular the previous year so that the pillared sedan was dropped from the model lineup. Also, new was a mid-year production (March 1957) Roadmaster designated as Model 75 that featured standard power seats and windows, carpeted lower doors, a one-piece rear window (instead of a three-piece that was a design feature of the smaller Special and Century models), Deluxe hubcaps, and a Series 75 script identification on the rear quarter body panel of the Roadmaster coupes and the rear door panels on the Roadmaster 4-doors, thus replacing the standard 3 chevrons found in the same location on the standard full model year Roadmaster model lines. Overall Roadmaster sales dropped to about 33,000. The overall economy was in a recession starting in late 1956 and extending into 1958.

For 1958, GM was promoting their fiftieth year of production, and introduced anniversary models for each brand; Cadillac, Buick, Oldsmobile, Pontiac, and Chevrolet. The 1958 models shared a common appearance on the top models for each brand; Cadillac Eldorado Seville, Buick Roadmaster Riviera, Oldsmobile Holiday 88, Pontiac Bonneville Catalina, and the all-new Chevrolet Bel-Air Impala.

In 1958, the Roadmaster was available in the well-equipped "75" version, and the body was adorned with bulkier and more heavily chromed styling while the top trim package Limited was the most expensive and fully optioned vehicle. A new "drawer pull" grille was used that Buick called "Fashion-Aire Dynastar", made up of rectangular chrome squares. For the first time since 1948, there were no distinguishing VentiPorts on the front fenders. On the rear deck, the Roadmaster name was spelled out in block lettering beneath a Buick emblem housing the trunk lock keyway. Wheelhouses had bright moldings, rocker panels had an ebbed molding and a large rear fender bright flash with ribbed inserts replaced the previous year's chromed rear fender lower panel. Four headlamps were standard. New brakes featured cast-iron liners in aluminum drums. Sales fell further to about 14,000.

There was a complete restyling for 1959, but this time the names of the various series were changed. Not until 1991 would there again be a big Buick known as the Roadmaster; the largest Buick models were renamed the Electra.

1991–1996

The Roadmaster name returned to the Buick line for the 1991 model year after a 33-year absence, with the third generation Buick Estate wagon becoming the Roadmaster Estate. A four-door sedan was added to the Roadmaster line for the 1992 model year, the first rear-wheel drive Buick sedan since 1985. Combined sales showed an over tenfold increase over 1991 thanks in part to an extended production run which had 1992 models going on sale in March 1991.

Chassis 
As with its precursor, the new Roadmaster Estate wagon was based on GM's full-size rear-wheel drive B platform, which was closely related to the GM C-body and D-body chassis reserved for top of the line Buicks and Cadillacs. It rode on the same 115.9-inch wheelbase in use since the wagon series was downsized from the C-body in 1977, yet was three inches shorter than the 1990 model.

The Roadmaster sedan, a C-body vehicle over its eight previous generations, shared the B-body for the first time in its history. Nonetheless, it stood not only as the largest Buick, a full 10 inches longer with a 5 inch greater wheelbase than the apparent top-of-the-line C-bodied Buick Park Avenue, but larger both in wheelbase (2 inches) and overall length (6 inches) than the K-body Cadillac Sedan de Ville.

Powertrain 
The standard engine for the 1991 wagon was a  5.0 L L03 Chevrolet small-block V8. It was replaced a year later with a  5.7 L L05 Chevrolet small-block V8 shared by both wagon and sedan. In 1994 both received a substantial power and performance boost with an upgrade to a modified version of the advanced 5.7 L sequential point fuel-injection LT1 V8 introduced two years earlier in the C4 Corvette.

This version of the LT1 was shared with a limited range of B-and D platform luxury and performance cars such as the Chevrolet Caprice Police Package and Cadillac Fleetwood, as well as specialty versions of GM's two F-bodied pony cars, the Chevrolet  Camaro Z28 and Pontiac Firebird Trans Am. Engines used in luxury cars had iron instead of aluminum heads for durability, camshafts tuned for increased low-end torque, and intake silencers to decrease engine noise.

While installed in part to better comply with emissions and fuel-economy standards, the LT1 V8 not only offered an 80 hp power increase but raised rated fuel economy by 1 mpg, to 17 mpg city/25 mpg highway. For 1996, the LT1 became OBD-II compliant.

All three Roadmaster V-8s were paired to a four-speed automatic transmission. In 1994, the hydraulically-controlled 4L60 (700R4) transmission was replaced by the electronically controlled 4L60E.

For the station wagon, this could be raised to 7,000 pounds with the use of a weight-distributing hitch, dual sway controls, setting rear tire pressure to 35 PSI, and disabling the Electronic Level Control. The towing package added 2.93 rear-axle gears and a limited-slip differential, heavy-duty cooling system including oil and transmission coolers, and a factory-installed self-leveling rear suspension called Dynaride, which consisting of air shocks, a height sensor between the rear axle and body and an on-board air compressor. Most visibly, a pair of electric fans offset to the left under the hood was replaced by the combination of one conventional fan-driven mechanically from the engine alongside one electric fan.

Body 
The Roadmaster Estate wagon shared its body with the Caprice Estate and Oldsmobile Custom Cruiser; common styling features included the Caprice's headlights and the Custom Cruiser's 2nd-row "Vista Roof" with a sunroof. Simulated woodgrain sides were standard, though the treatment could be removed for credit. All three wagons offered an optional rear-facing third-row seat, bringing seating capacity to eight. The Roadmaster sedan had a distinct fascia, featuring its own grille and headlights stacked above running lights and turn signals. It shared a formal sedan roofline with the Cadillac Fleetwood, but was nine inches shorter in length and six inches in wheelbase.

The interior received a redesign for the 1994 model year which included new dual airbags, moving some instrument panel gauges closer to the steering wheel, and revisions to the radio and climate controls. The side-view mirrors were changed in 1995, changing from a "Lolipop" style mirror mounted on the door skin, to a new folding design mounted on the sail panel. The 1995 Roadmaster retained its skirted rear wheels (removed from the Caprice/Impala SS), while the sedan was updated with new bodyside moldings. Station wagons saw a shade for the Vista Roof along with a cargo cover. In 1996 automatic climate control became standard, and the rear seatbelts were redesigned with a "cinching" feature.

Discontinuation 
In spite of a production run of over 200,000 Roadmasters in a six-year span, a combination of overcrowding among Buick's high-end sedans and pressure from full-size SUVs on the Estate wagon led to GM focusing on higher profit margin vehicles, such as pickups and the truck-bodied Chevrolet Suburban. In 1996 the Arlington Assembly facility in Texas was converted to assemble both SUVs and pickup trucks, leaving the Roadmaster without an assembly line. The final vehicle was produced on December 13, 1996. All 1996 Roadmaster Estates received a "Collector's Edition" hood ornament in place of the traditional tri-shield Buick badge.

With Ford stopping production of its Country Squire and Colony Park station wagons in 1991, the discontinuation of the Roadmaster Estate and Chevrolet Caprice Estate marked the end of the full-size station wagon until the introduction of the 20" shorter, 5" inch narrower LX-bodied Dodge Magnum wagon in 2005.

Production Figures:

References

External links

Consumer guide to the 1991-96 Buick Roadmaster

Roadmaster
Rear-wheel-drive vehicles
Station wagons
Sedans
Coupés
Convertibles
1950s cars
1980s cars
1990s cars
Motor vehicles manufactured in the United States
Flagship vehicles
Luxury vehicles